A. N. Narasimhia (Agaram Narasimha Narasimhia) is an epigraphist and scholar of the Kannada language, especially its historical aspects.

Career
Narasimhia received his PhD, under the supervision of Professor R. L. Turner, from the School of Oriental and African Studies, University of London in 1933.  Upon his return to India, he became the librarian and part-time professor of philology at the Maharaja College of Mysore.  In 1941, the University of Mysore published his PhD thesis, A Grammar of the Oldest Kanarese inscriptions, as the first volume in its series "Studies in Dravidian Philology." The book was reviewed by Thomas Burrow, in the Bulletin of the School of Oriental and African Studies, University of London, Vol. 11, No. 1 (1943), pp. 230–231, and along with G. S. Gai's later published A Historical Grammar of Old Kannada, is regarded as a pioneering study in the field.

See also
Kappe Arabhatta
Tripadi
Halmidi inscription

References

External links
Library of Congress Catalog

20th-century Indian linguists
Possibly living people
Academic staff of the University of Mysore
Indian epigraphers
Academic staff of Maharaja's College, Mysore